Bangladesh Oceanographic Research Institute is a Bangladesh government research institute under the Ministry of Science and Technology that engages in oceanographic research.

History
Bangladesh Oceanographic Research Institute was established in 2015 after the passage in parliament of the Bangladesh Oceanographic Research Institute Act, 2015.

References

2015 establishments in Bangladesh
Organisations based in Cox's Bazar
Government agencies of Bangladesh
Research institutes in Bangladesh